A5120 may refer to:
 A 5120, a microcomputer manufactured by VEB Robotron in East Germany
 A5120 road, an A-class road in England